This is the production discography of Korean-American rapper, songwriter, and record producer Teddy Park. Park was previously a member of the hip hop group 1TYM and is currently an in-house producer at YG Entertainment.

Credits are adapted from the Korea Music Copyright Association and indicate where Park has writing or co-writing credits for lyrics, music, or song arrangement.

1998-2009

2010-2019

2020-present

References

Park Teddy